List winners of Dutch championship in International draughts.

The first official championship took place in 1908. Since 1911 under auspice of Koninklijke Nederlandse Dambond (KNDB). Many Dutch draughts players became world champion in International draughts.

References 

Draughts competitions